Standings and results for Group E of the Top 16 phase of the 2007-08 Euroleague basketball tournament.

Main page: Euroleague 2007-08

Standings

Fixtures and results

All times given below are in Central European Time.

Game 1
February 13–14, 2008

Game 2
February 20, 2008

Game 3
February 28, 2008

Game 4
March 5, 2008

Game 5
March 12, 2008

Game 6
March 19, 2008

2007–08 Euroleague